Roman Zubinsky Phifer (born March 5, 1968) is an American former professional football player who was a linebacker in the National Football League (NFL). Known primarily as a member of the New England Patriots, Phifer is currently the Senior Personnel Executive for the Denver Broncos.

Phifer also played for the Los Angeles/St. Louis Rams, the New York Jets, and the New York Giants. He played in 211 NFL games and made 1134 tackles, 882 were solo, 252 assisted, 29 sacks, and 11 interceptions and was a four-time Pro Bowl Alternate. Phifer played football and majored in history at the University of California Los Angeles and is a graduate of South Mecklenburg High School in Charlotte, North Carolina.

High school career

South Mecklenburg High School
Phifer was a two-time All-Conference selection, earning All-County and Charlotte Post Athlete of the Year honors as a senior at South Mecklenburg. He was a three-year letterman in football and basketball and also competed in track and field in the high jump (6′6″) and triple jump (44′8″).

College career

UCLA
As a senior at UCLA, Phifer totaled 71 tackles (9 for a loss) 3 interceptions and 3 sacks and was named an honorable mention All-America. He missed the 1989 season due to an off-field beating incident along with teammate Damion Lyons. Their prior year, 1988, Phifer was primarily a special teams player, recorded 14 tackles (seven unassisted) on defense. As a Sophomore in 1987 he recorded 27 tackles, including one for a loss. He redshirted his freshman year of 1986.

Professional career

Pre Draft
Pre-draft measurables
Phifer was 6'2" and 230 pounds and bench pressed 380 pounds and ran a 4.73 forty-yard dash.  Scouts said, "An underrated outside linebacker who came on strong his senior year. Very good open field tackler with legitimate speed and cover ability, Uses his quickness in rushing the passer."

Rams
He was drafted in the 2nd round (31st overall pick) in the 1991 NFL Draft by the Rams out of UCLA. While at UCLA one of his roommates was the late Eric Turner. On July 17, 1991, Phifer signed a 3-year $1.5 million contract with the Rams, including a $450,000 signing bonus. He started  as a rookie in 1991 until an ankle injury ended his season. He totaled 24 tackles on the season (21 solo).

Phifer was a starter for the Rams from 1992–1998. In 1992 Phifer made 66 tackles (51 solo) and defensed six passes. Phifer led the Rams in tackles in 1993 from his "Will'" or outside linebacker position. In the summer of 1994 the restricted free agent Phifer signed a tender-offer of $649,000. However, since Phifer and his agent felt there were no negotiations he was reluctant to sign a further deal. Phifer had another solid season in 1994. However, during the confusion of the Rams moving from Los Angeles to St. Louis, Phifer signed a four-year, $8.5 million contract that includes a $2.5 million signing bonus. He was the Rams' Ed Block Courage Award winner in 1995. He was also a Pro Bowl alternate in 1995 and led the Rams in tackles 1995 with 125 to go with his 3 sacks, 3 interceptions a forced fumble and a fumble recovery. He again led Rams tackles in 1996 with 122, when he was again voted a Pro Bowl alternate.

In his years with the Rams he played under several different defensive coordinators. Under his first coach the Rams featured the Chicago Bears-style "46" defense that was brought in by recent Tennessee Titans Head coach Jeff Fisher. The next season it changed to a less pressure defense to more of a standard NFL defenses. In 1995 that changed with a new defensive coordinator who introduced the Rams "Jet" defense, where the lineman were in pass rush mode at all times. A couple of years later he began to play in Bud Carson's multiple defenses where Roman was asked to rush the passer more. In the "Jet" defense he was often the only LBer on the field and was asked to cover running backs in coverage and still stop running plays. It was under Carson's defense that Phifer would play the equivalent of a safety on one play and the equivalent of defensive end on another play and a run-stuffing linebacker on another and a pass-cover linebacker as yet a fourth way to play defense. In 1998, he had a career-high 6.5 sacks and 71 tackles with an interception a forced fumble and a fumble recovery on an improving Rams defense, with his career high in sacks being the result of playing standup defensive end some of the snaps.

Jets
The Rams stated they wanted to keep Phifer but reportedly acted too slow to sign Phifer and on March 6, 1999, he signed a 3-year $8.9 million contract with the New York Jets. Less than six days later the Rams signed Patriot linebacker Todd Collins so replace Phifer. Phifer played two seasons for the Jets getting 4.5 sacks, 3 forced fumbles in 1999 along with 2 interceptions and 50 tackles. In 2000, he had 45 tackles and 4 sacks. After the 2000 season the Jets released Phifer in an effort to "revamp the linebacking corps" into a younger group and also to switch from a 3-4 defense to a 4-3, causing Phifer to not be able to earn the approximately $2.5 million due in 2001 of his 3-year contract signed in 1999.

Patriots
The New England Patriots signed Phifer to a 1-year veteran minimum contract of $520,000. Phifer started 16 games and recorded 93 tackles for the 2001 Super Bowl Champion Patriots. He also had 2 sacks, defensed 5 passes, intercepted a pass, forced 2 fumbles and recovered 2 fumbles. Even more he provided leadership and was essential to the Patriots success. "Roman Phifer is the MVP of the season", said cornerback Terrell Buckley, "He may be overlooked, and he would never campaign for the honor but he deserves it."

Phifer making the Super Bowl was one of the side-show stories of Super Bowl week, with the St. Louis and the Boston-area papers doing feature stories on Phifer's Rams connection and now playing them in the "big game." He helped the Patriots to win Super Bowl XXXVI and was rewarded on the off season. On June 21, 2002, the Patriots offered Phifer a 3-year $4.5 million contract with $1.8 million in signing bonuses. In 2002, Phifer made 109 tackles and started 14 games and was again an alternate to the Pro Bowl.

In 2003, he had 100 tackles and batted away 5 passes as the Patriots won Super Bowl XXXVIII. In the Super Bowl, Phifer made 5 tackles and nearly intercepted a Jake Delhome pass, but it would have been nullified due to a roughing call on tackle Richard Seymour. After the season, Phifer was a Pro Bowl Alternate for the fourth time in his career.

The 2004 season saw Phifer play a backup role in the Patriot defense. He struggled with an injured calf and his role had diminished as well. He ended the season with 40 tackles, a sack, and interception, a fumble recovery and knocked down two passes as the Patriots won Super Bowl XXXIX in Jacksonville, Florida. Phifer's contract expired at the end of the season. He was released on February 27, 2005.

Giants
He had a short stint with the New York Giants in 2005, signing a veteran-minimum contract that yielded him approximately $150,000 for two weeks work. He came in for one last chance and to bring leadership to the Giants, perhaps similar to what he brought to the Patriots in his 2001 season.

In his career, he played in 211 games, had 1,134 tackles, 882 solo, 252 assisted, 29 sacks, and 11 interceptions.

NFL statistics

Coaching career

Broncos
On February 9, 2009, Phifer was hired as the assistant linebackers coach for the Denver Broncos, assisting linebackers coach Don Martindale. Phifer helped outside linebacker Elvis Dumervil achieve a league-leading and franchise record 17 sacks on the season and Pro Bowl berth, as well as making inside linebacker D.J. Williams a Pro Bowl alternate after ranking 11th in the league with a team-high 122 tackles.

Film producing career

Blood Equity 
In 2009 Phifer produced his first documentary film entitled Blood Equity, which covers the lives of several former NFL players, both big stars and rank-and-file players. The film features testimonials from NFL legends like Mike Ditka, Tony Dorsett, Darryl "Moose" Johnston and Willie Wood among others about the hardships and struggles of life after football. "He's like the Godfather of football, and you definitely get that from him when he lights up that cigar. These guys are like brothers, and he's just trying to speak on their behalf", says Rico McClinton of Iron Mike Ditka (McClinton produced the film along with Phifer and Joe Ruggiero).

The Los Angeles Times, in reviewing the documentary stated, "Everybody who plays leaves with something", says retired New York Giants linebacker Harry Carson in the documentary "Blood Equity" but, sadly, he doesn't mean a glorious pension or athletic pride. He's referring to the physical and mental struggles of ex-football players who feel monetarily neglected by the now $7.1-billion sport and its union when, as studies increasingly show, the game's built-in brutality—and fierce pride in playing injured—leads to a post-career life of constant medical care. ... (Footage of Baltimore Colts legend John Mackey not recognizing family photos is especially heartbreaking.)" Blood Equity is distributed by Walking Shadows and is sold in popular online retailers such as Barnes & Noble, Amazon, Hastings, Alibris, among others. Phifer is hoping that his message reaches those who have rooted for NFL players during their playing years.

References

External links
 
 

1968 births
Living people
People from Plattsburgh, New York
American football outside linebackers
University of California, Los Angeles alumni
UCLA Bruins football players
Los Angeles Rams players
St. Louis Rams players
New York Jets players
New England Patriots players
New York Giants players
Denver Broncos coaches
Ed Block Courage Award recipients